Malcolm Glazzard (1 July 1931 – 26 June 2012) was an English footballer who played as a forward in the Football League for Accrington Stanley.

Glazzard was born in Eastham, which was then in Cheshire. He came through the junior teams at Liverpool, without making a first-team appearance, and played for Macclesfield Town, for whom he scored more than 100 Cheshire League goals over three seasons. After completing his geography degree at the University of Manchester, Glazzard settled in the United States, where he taught, and played soccer for the Los Angeles Scots. He was married to Pat, and died at home in Rhode Island in 2015.

References

1931 births
2012 deaths
People from Eastham, Merseyside
English footballers
Association football forwards
Liverpool F.C. players
Accrington Stanley F.C. (1891) players
Macclesfield Town F.C. players
English Football League players
Alumni of the University of Manchester